Cynheidre Colliery was a coal mine located in the Gwendraeth valley, in Carmarthenshire, South Wales. Opened in 1954, it closed in 1989.

Cynheidre was developed by the National Coal Board as one of the West Wales "super pits" alongside Abernant Colliery in the River Amman valley, a post-World War II investment intended to keep economic coal mining a viable industry in the area. Created to exploit  of deep lying anthracite seams, it was envisaged to eventually encompass the working of the drift mines at the Great Mountain Colliery and Pentremawr.

In 1955, shaft No.3 was created. By 1960, the colliery employed 650 men producing 30,757 tons of coal.

After these developments, Pentremawr was integrated under Cynheidre in 1973, connected both underground as well as overground by the Llanelly and Mynydd Mawr Railway.

From both the structure of local geology and knowledge from workings at Pentremawr, it was known that the coal field suffered from methane gas intrusion. On 6 April 1971 six miners lost their lives in an explosion of methane gas and fine coal dust. In 1972, Cynheidre produced 472,000 tons of coal employing 1,430 men.

Cynheidre was to be the site of the proposed Carway Fawr Drift Mine. Development work started in 1986, but along with the residual Cynheidre underground workings, closed in January 1989 while employing 1,043 men.

In 2006, the site was proposed as the location of a human waste-to-compost plant, but was turned down on planning permission.

References

In 2009 Gwendraeth Valley Recycling Ltd established a Waste Transfer Station / Recycling Yard at the site of the former Carway Fawr winding shed/ control room and yard, within Cynheidre Colliery to the North of shafts 1 and 2.

External links
Cynheidre Colliery at WelshCoalMines.co.uk
Cynheidre Colliery at BBC Wales

Collieries in South Wales
Underground mines in Wales
Buildings and structures in Carmarthenshire
Llanelli Rural